Swarda Thigale is an Indian television actress who is best known as Dr. Sanchi Malhotra in Savitri Devi College & Hospital and as Shivika Gupta in Pyaar Ke Papad.

Career
Thigale started her career, in 2013, with the lead role in Marathi show Majhe Mann Tujhe Zhale as Shubhra. In 2013, She also made her film debut in Marathi film Thoda Tuza Thoda Maza. In 2017, Thigale debuted in Hindi TV with Savitri Devi College & Hospital opposite Vikram Sakhalkar and Varun Kapoor. Later, she played several lead roles in Hindi TV shows and films.

Filmography

Television

Films

Theatre

Awards and nominations

See also 
 List of Hindi television actresses
 List of Indian television actresses

References

External links 
 

Living people
Indian television actresses
Actresses in Marathi television
Actresses in Hindi television
Indian soap opera actresses
21st-century Indian actresses
Actresses from Pune
Year of birth missing (living people)